Horfield is a suburb of the city of Bristol, in southwest England. It lies on Bristol's northern edge, its border with Filton marking part of the boundary between Bristol and South Gloucestershire. Bishopston lies directly to the south. Monks Park and Golden Hill are to the west. Lockleaze and Ashley Down are on the eastern fringe. The Gloucester Road (A38) runs north–south through the suburb.

Horfield is also the name of a ward for Bristol City Council.  The ward includes Monks Park and Southmead Hospital, but does not include the southern part of Horfield, including Horfield Common and Horfield Prison, which is in Bishopston ward.

History 

The name is Anglo-Saxon in origin, and means "filthy open land" (Old English horu and feld).

Horfield was a parish in the hundred of Berkeley in Gloucestershire, which included Bishopston, Golden Hill, Lockleaze and part of Ashley Down.

Historically, the area had a reputation as a lawless place because Horfield Wood was the haunt of thieves and vagrants. The area remained rural until the early 19th century.

Following the 1831 Bristol Riots, during which the local gaol burnt down, Horfield Prison was completed in 1847. A permanent military presence was established in the city with the completion of Horfield Barracks also in 1847.

Horfield was mostly developed from the mid 19th century onwards.  In 1859, Bishopston became a separate parish.  The remainder of Horfield became a civil parish in 1866, when civil parishes were introduced.  In 1894 Horfield Urban District was formed, but in 1904 it was absorbed into Bristol.

Amenities 

Horfield is home to the Memorial Stadium: a sports stadium built in 1921 for Bristol Rugby Club in memory of the rugby union players of the city who died in World War I, and rededicated to also commemorate the dead of World War II. In 1996, the ground also became home to Bristol Rovers Football Club who now own it. Bristol Rugby Club has since moved out of the ground and is now based at the Bristol City FC stadium in the south of the city.

Near the Memorial Stadium is The Wellington, CAMRA Bristol & District joint winner of Pub of the Year for 2005. The 2006 Pub of the Year is also in Horfield, The Inn on the Green (on the Gloucester Road)

Horfield has a leisure centre that was updated to have a 25-metre swimming pool in 2005. Horfield Leisure Centre has a gym, swimming pool and learners pool, and a sports hall. Outside the complex is a small skateboard park. The leisure centre was built in the 1980s on open ground opposite the old Horfield Barracks, where open and closed-in rifle ranges once stood.

Of Horfield's green spaces, Horfield Common is the largest, having a central enclosure of tennis courts and a bowling club. Horfield Common is one of Bristol's highest points of land above sea level.

There is a Library on Filton Avenue.

There is a Primary School, Filton Avenue Primary School, also on Filton Avenue.

There are two GP Surgeries that serve Horfield. Horfield Health Centre, and Monks Park Surgery

The nearest hospital is Southmead Hospital, a large public National Health Service hospital, situated a short distance away in the Southmead ward of Bristol. It is part of the North Bristol NHS Trust.

The nearest Police Station used to be situated just west of Horfield on Southmead Road, however this was closed and replaced by a care home. The nearest Police Station is now a community police station based in the grounds of Southmead Hospital.

Transport 
Horfield is served by bus services on Gloucester Road (First West of England routes 24, 25, 70, 71, 72, 73, 75, 76, 78 and 79 and Wessex Connect routes 3A, 3C commuter buses to Aztec West and 11,12, 15 and 19), and Muller Road (Wessex Connect routes 506 and 507).

The main road running through Horfield is the Gloucester Road section of the A38 and is the longest road of independent shops in the UK.

Historically, from the latter part of the 19th century until the first third of the 20th century, Horfield was served by Bristol's tram system, with Horfield having its own tram depot near the junction of Gloucester Road and Church Road. The tram depot site is now a petrol station and a doctor's surgery at the rear. Tram lines which once lead into the depot have been preserved in the surface of the car park of the surgery.

Between 1927 and 1964, the northeast part of the district was served by Horfield railway station.

Notable residents 

Famous sons of Horfield include Hollywood actor Cary Grant, who was born (but christened Archibald Leach) at 15 Hughenden Road in 1904, and composer Ray Steadman-Allen was born at 64 Muller Road in 1922. The cartoonist Annie Fish was born at Brynland Avenue in 1890.

Politics

The parish of Horfield includes Horfield ward to the north, part of the Bristol North West parliamentary constituency, represented since 2017 by Darren Jones, Labour. On Bristol City Council, Horfield ward sends two councillors. Currently, these are Cllr Tom Renhard (Labour) and Cllr Philippa Hulme (Labour).

The southern part of the parish is in Bishopston ward, in Bristol West parliamentary constituency. The sitting MP since 2015 is Thangam Debbonaire, Labour. The current councillors are Cllr David Willingham (Liberal Democrat) and Cllr Daniella Radice (Green)

Churches
There are a number of interesting churches in Horfield.

Church of the Holy Trinity with St Edmund – the parish church was possibly founded as early as 603 but the earliest remnant is an old pillar and the circular churchyard. The tower is late 15th century or early 16th century with the nave and aisles added to by William Butterfield in 1847. The central tower was erected in 1893 by local firm Crisp & Oately and the transepts later in 1913 and 1929. It is a grade II* listed building.

St. Edmunds Church – erected in the lancet style in 1860 by ST Welch erected as a school and then given a tower and side aisles in 1930 by Hartland Thomas. A building with a roof (similar to Horfield Parish), Anglo catholic interior, and a high church tradition. The church closed in 1979 and was a printers but was demolished in 2006 – the local planning authority did not request obligatory photos.

Horfield Barracks chapel – erected 1859 (not 1847 as in Buildings of England). A fine lancet styled chapel with some good handling of dressings and very good bellcote. Closed in the 1920s, the chapel lay dormant for decades until being converted to offices in the 1980s. It is grade II listed.

Methodist Chapel – 1899 by La Trobe – very good essay in late Victorian Arts and Crafts Gothic with a fine wooden interior.

The former Salvation Army chapel – in Ashley Down Road.

Horfield Baptist Chapel – a twin towered perpendicular chapel by Milverton Drake with an organ by Hele.

The Roman Catholic Chapel of St Maximillian Kolbe with St Edith Stein and the Holocaust Martyrs – in Alfoxton Road.

Quaker meeting house of 1906 – domestic red brick.

Whitefield Tabernacle Muller Road – Contains the 18th century pulpit removed from Penn Street Tabernacle when that was demolished to make way for the city centre. It also contains the superb 1815 wooden organ case.

References

External links

 Ward Map (PDF)

Areas of Bristol
Wards of Bristol
Former civil parishes in Bristol